After the death of Republican Congresswoman Jo Ann Davis on October 6, 2007, a special election was required to fill the vacancy for the remainder of the 110th United States Congress. Governor Tim Kaine announced that the election would occur on December 11, 2007.  The Republican and Democratic candidates were selected by political conventions on November 10, 2007.  Republican state legislator Rob Wittman was elected, defeating Democratic nominee Philip Forgit and independent candidate Lucky Narain.

Candidates

Democratic
Democrats nominated Iraq War veteran and former teacher Philip Forgit over retired United States Navy Captain Ted Hontz by a 106–91 convention vote. The Democratic convention was held in Williamsburg, Virginia. The Democratic Congressional Campaign Committee did not invest large amounts of money into the campaign, opting instead to fund Robin Weirauch's campaign in a special congressional election in Ohio.

Republican
After five ballots, Republicans chose State Delegate Rob Wittman as their nominee when Paul Jost withdrew before the sixth ballot could be announced. The Republican convention was held at Caroline High School in Caroline County, Virginia. The Republican convention drew a wide variety of candidates, including former State Delegate Dick Black; former Republican Party official Jim Bowden; Sherwood Bowditch, the Director of the Virginia Alliance of Boys and Girls Clubs; David Caprara, an activist; retired FBI agent David Corderman; Chuck Davis, the widower of late Congresswoman Davis; businessman Paul Jost, attorney Kevin O'Neill, and businessman Rob Quartel.

Independent
Lucky Narain, a former Peace Corps volunteer, Army Reservist, and grant writer from Yorktown, filed the necessary petitions to be placed on the ballot as an independent candidate. He criticized Wittman for supporting a transportation tax increase despite having signed an anti-tax pledge; Wittman claimed that he had not signed that particular pledge.

General election results

See also
 List of special elections to the United States House of Representatives

References

2007 01
Virginia 01
Virginia 2007 01
United States House of Representatives 01
United States House of Representatives 2007 01
Virginia 01